Harrow is a surname meaning a person who harrowed the land. Notable people with the surname include:

Andy Harrow (born 1956), Scottish former football player
Belinda Harrow (born 1971), New Zealand artist
Jack Harrow (1888-1958), English footballer
Lisa Harrow (born 1943), New Zealand actress
Nancy Harrow (born 1930), American jazz singer
William Harrow (1822–1872), lawyer and controversial Union general in the American Civil War

Fictional characters:
Jonas Harrow, an enemy of Spider-Man in the Marvel Comics universe
Richard Harrow, a WWI soldier turned contract killer in the HBO series Boardwalk Empire

Occupational surnames
English-language occupational surnames